Sistani, also known as Sistooni and Zaboli, is a dialect continuum of the Persian language spoken by Sistani people in Iran and Afghanistan. It is part of the Southwestern Iranian branch of the Indo-Iranian group of Indo-European languages.

Sistani Phrases

Comparison between Sistani dialect of Persian and Balochi language

Sistani Words

References

Sources
 "The Status of [h] and [ʔ] in the Sistani Dialect of Miyankangi". Carina Jahani, Farideh Okati, Abbas Ali Ahangar. Iranian Journal of Applied Language Studies, 1:1 (2009), pp. 80–99.
 "Natural Phonological Processes in Sistani Persian of Iran". Okati, Farideh, Ahangar, Abbas Ali, Anonby, Erik, Jahani, Carina. Iranian Journal of Applied Language Studies, 2:1, (2010), pp. 93–120.
Lazard, Gilbert (1974). “Morphologie du verbe dans le parler persan du Sistan”, in Studia Iranica 3.

See also
 Baas-o-Beyt
 Gholamali Raisozzakerin

External links
Foundation for Sistanian Orthography Development - official site (in Persian)
Zaraya: Sistanian Analytical Bulletin - (in Persian)

 
Languages of Iran
Languages of Afghanistan
Persian dialects and varieties